Nematus leucotrochus is a species of sawfly in the family Tenthredinidae, known as the pale-spotted gooseberry sawfly. Widespread throughout central and northern Europe, this insect is best known as a pest of gooseberries. The larvae feed on the foliage of the plant, defoliating it. Unlike Nematus ribesii, the common gooseberry sawfly, the species has a single brood. Adults appear in early May and larvae in May and June.

References

Tenthredinidae
Agricultural pest insects